Colta may refer to:
 Colta District, in Peru
 Colta Canton, in Ecuador
 Colta.ru, a Russian online publication
 Vasile Colța (born 1953), Moldovan politician

See also 
 Kolta (disambiguation)